Muzaffarabad  Airport  is a domestic airport, located at Muzaffarabad, Azad Kashmir, Pakistan.

Airlines and destinations
There are no scheduled flights to this airport. The last time it saw a reasonable amount of traffic was during the rescue operations immediately after the Muzaffarabad earthquake in 2005.

See also 
 List of airports in Pakistan
 Rawalakot Airport
 Skardu International Airport

References

Airports in Azad Kashmir